South African singer-songwriter and record producer Zonke has won eight awards from twenty-eight nominations. She won her first major award in 2008 at the 14th South African Music Awards after her song "Ekhaya" won "Best Record of the Year".

Channel O Africa Music Video Awards
First held in 2003 as Reel Music Video Awards, the Channel O Africa Music Video Awards are Pan-African music awards organised by South Africa-based television channel Channel O. Zonke has won the award once.

!
|-
|2013
|"Feelings"
|Most Gifted Female Video of the Year
|
|style="text-align:center;"|

Metro FM Music Awards
Metro FM Music Awards is an annual awards ceremony that was established in 2000 by Metro FM with the aim of offering its listeners to honour their favorite South African artists. Zonke has won one award out of nine nominations.

!
|-
|rowspan="2"|2007
|"Ekhaya"
|Song of the Year
|
|style="text-align:center;"|
|-
|Herself
|Best Newcomer
|
|style="text-align:center;"|
|-
|2011
|"Thinking About You" 
|Best Collaboration of the Year
|
|style="text-align:center;"|
|-
|rowspan="3"|2013
|rowspan="2"|Ina Ethe
|Best Female Album
|
|style="text-align:center;"|
|-
|Best Produced Album
|
|style="text-align:center;"|
|-
|"Feelings"
|Song of the Year
|
|style="text-align:center;"|
|-
|rowspan="3"|2016
|"Reach It"
|Best R&B Single
|
|style="text-align:center;"|
|-
|rowspan="2"|Work of Heart
|Best African Pop Album
|
|style="text-align:center;"|
|-
|Best Female Album
|
|style="text-align:center;"|

MTV Africa Music Awards
The MTV Africa Music Awards were established in 2008 by MTV Networks Africa to celebrate the most popular contemporary music in Africa.

!
|-
|2008
|Herself
|Best Female Artist
|
|style="text-align:center;"|

South African Music Awards
The South African Music Awards (also known as The SAMAs) are the Recording Industry of South Africa's music industry awards, established in 1995.

!
|-
|rowspan="4"|2008
|"Ekhaya"
|Record of the Year
|
|style="text-align:center;"|
|-
|rowspan="3"|Life, Love 'n Music
|Album of the Year
|
|style="text-align:center;"|
|-
|Best Urban Pop Album
|
|style="text-align:center;"|
|-
|Best Female Album
|
|style="text-align:center;"|
|-
|rowspan="4"|2012
|"Thinking About You" 
|Record of the Year
|
|style="text-align:center;"|
|-
|rowspan="2"|Ina Ethe
|Album of the Year
|
|style="text-align:center;"|
|-
|Best African Adult Album
|
|style="text-align:center;"|
|-
|Herself
|Female Artist of the Year
|
|style="text-align:center;"|
|-
|rowspan="2"|2014
|rowspan="2"|Give and Take Live
|Best African Adult Album
|
|style="text-align:center;"|
|-
|Best Live DVD
|
|style="text-align:center;"|
|-
|rowspan="4"|2016
|Herself
|Female Artist of the Year
|
|style="text-align:center;"|
|-
|rowspan="3"|Work of Heart
|Best Engineered Album of the Year
|
|style="text-align:center;"|
|-
|Best Produced Album of the Year
|
|style="text-align:center;"|
|-
|Best R&B/Soul/Reggae Album
|
|style="text-align:center;"|
|-
|rowspan ="4"|2019
|rowspan="4"|L.O.V.E
|Album of the Year
|
|rowspan ="4"|
|-
|Female Artist of the Year
|
|-
|Best R&B/Soul Album
|
|-
|Best Produced Album 
|

References

Zonke